Mordellistena auromaculata is a beetle in the genus Mordellistena of the family Mordellidae. It was described in 1928 by Kôno.

References

auromaculata
Beetles described in 1928